Spialia wrefordi, Wreford's grizzled skipper, is a butterfly in the family Hesperiidae. It is found in western and southern north-eastern Uganda and central and south-eastern Kenya.

References

Spialia
Butterflies described in 1951